"Fooling Yourself (The Angry Young Man)" is the second single released from Styx's The Grand Illusion (1977) album. On the Billboard Hot 100 pop chart in the U.S., the single peaked at #29 in April 1978. It also hit no. 20 on the Canada RPM Top Singles chart the week of May 6, 1978.

The song was written by guitarist Tommy Shaw. It was originally based on Shaw's initial perception of Styx keyboardist Dennis DeYoung — an "angry young man" who viewed the group's successes with a wary eye and grew angry or depressed with every setback. It was only in later years that Shaw began to see himself in the lyrics, and the song took on a more personal meaning to him.

The composition features a number of time signature changes. The intro and outro are performed in  time, led by Shaw's acoustic guitar tracks and Dennis DeYoung's synthesizer melodies. After a brief intro recap, there is a brief break with two measures of  time, and then a return to the  meter, with another synthesizer solo, before fading out.

Record World said that the song "starts acoustically and builds with synthesizers and guitars to a swirling finish." Record World also said that "the message is both positive and cautionary, and several voices add their effect to a likely radio favorite."

Chart performance

Weekly charts

Year-end charts

Personnel
 Tommy Shaw – lead vocals, acoustic lead guitar
 James Young – electric rhythm guitar, backing vocals
 Dennis DeYoung – keyboards, backing vocals
 Chuck Panozzo – bass
 John Panozzo – drums

References

External links 
 Styx - "Fooling Yourself (The Angry Young Man)" (1977) song to be listened as stream at Spotify.com

1977 songs
1978 singles
Songs written by Tommy Shaw
Styx (band) songs
A&M Records singles